Phacelia fimbriata,  the fringed phacelia, is a spring flowering wildflower of the genus Phacelia found in the highland woods of southeastern United States including the Great Smoky Mountains.

References

Campbell, Carlos C., William F. Hutson, Aaron J. Sharp.  1970. Great Smoky Mountains Wild Flowers.  3rd ED.  The University of Tennessee Press.  page 42.
Horn, Cathcart, Hemmerly, Duhl. 2005. Wildflowers of Tennessee, the Ohio Valley, and the Southern Appalachians. Lone Pine Publishing. p 246.  
DiscoverLife.org

fimbriata